Sign of Chaos is a fantasy novel by American writer Roger Zelazny, published in 1987. It is the third novel in the second Chronicles of Amber series, and the eighth book overall in the Amber series. The title of this book mirrors that of Sign of the Unicorn, the third book in the first Amber series.

Plot summary
Merlin realises that Wonderland, where he and Luke are trapped, is an LSD-induced hallucination made real by Luke's powers over shadow. As a Fire Angel (a vicious creature from Chaos) pursues them, he administers medicine to Luke. The Fire Angel is weakened in a fight with the Jabberwock and Merlin is able to finish it off with the vorpal sword. He leaves Luke to sober up.

He seeks his stepbrother Mandor, who thinks that their half-brother Jurt may be trying to kill Merlin in order to take the throne of Chaos. Fiona contacts them, and they investigate a shadow-storm. Merlin and Mandor return to Amber, and then along with Jasra they wrest the Keep of the Four worlds from Jurt and the sorcerer, Mask. They learn that Jurt has (at least partially) turned himself into a living Trump, as Brand did, and that the sorcerer Mask is in fact Merlin's ex-girlfriend Julia.

References to other works
While fleeing the Fire Angel, Merlin passes through a field of flowers whose scent is intoxicating. This is an allusion to The Wizard of Oz.

"Old John", Random's assassin whom Merlin encounters at Bloody Bill's, is a reference to the comic book character Grimjack.

When speaking with Nayda, Merlin remarks, "I'd like to meet the person who wrote the reports. There may be a great creative talent going to waste in a government office". Zelazny worked for several years for the Social Security Administration before quitting to write full-time.

External links
 Sign of Chaos at Worlds Without End

The Chronicles of Amber books
1987 novels
1987 fantasy novels
Arbor House books